Ultravasan is an annual ultramarathon and trail run in Sweden, which was hosted for the first time in 2014.

The race is arranged on two distances:
 Ultravasan 45: 45 km, start in Oxberg and goal in Mora, following the second half of the Vasaloppet trail.
 Ultravasan 90: 90 km, start in Sälen and goal in Mora, following the same trail as Vasaloppet.

Ultravasan 45
Course records with green background.

Ultravasan 90
Course records with green background.

References

External links
 Ultravasan 45
 Ultravasan 90

August sporting events
International athletics competitions hosted by Sweden
Ultramarathons
Recurring sporting events established in 2014
Trail running competitions
2014 establishments in Sweden